Switzman v Elbling and A.G. of Quebec, [1957] SCR 285 is a Supreme Court of Canada decision in which the Court ruled that Quebec's Act to Protect the Province Against Communistic Propaganda, commonly known as the "Padlock Law", was ultra vires of the provincial legislature. The Court held that the Padlock Law was a statute respecting criminal law, which is the exclusive authority of the Parliament of Canada under the British North America Act, 1867. Rand, Kellock, and Abbott JJ further held that the law was ultra vires because it violated freedom of expression guaranteed under an implied bill of rights springing from the "democratic form of government established in Canada", but this view was not shared by the rest of the majority.

History
Max Bailey, was a resident of a Park Avenue apartment in Montreal. In February 1948, Bailey, a former Montreal City Councillor and a Communist himself, wanted to assign his apartment to John Switzman, a prominent Marxist who wanted to turn the apartment into a local Communist hub. Freda Elbling, the landlord, tried to prevent Switzman from taking the apartment for fear of having her building appropriated by the province under the Padlock Law. Failing that, she applied to the court to have the lease cancelled.

In his defence, Switzman challenged the Padlock Law as a violation of freedom of speech and as a law ultra vires the power of the provincial government. At trial and on appeal, the courts found in favour of Elbling.

In an 8 to 1 decision, the Supreme Court found that the law was ultra vires and it was struck down.

References

External links
 full text of decision from canlii.org

Canadian federalism case law
Canadian freedom of expression case law
Supreme Court of Canada cases
Supreme Court of Canada case articles without infoboxes
1957 in Canadian case law
Censorship in Canada